Boneh-ye Seyyed Mohammad Reza (also Romanized as Boneh-ye Seyyed Moḩammad Reẕā) is a village in Khesht Rural District, Khesht District, Kazerun County, Fars Province, Iran. At the 2006 census, its population was 632, in 136 families.

References 

Populated places in Kazerun County